Padre Pio: Miracle Man is a 2000 Italian television movie directed by Carlo Carlei. The film is based on the book Padre Pio: Man of Hope by Renzo Allegri and it depicts real life events of Roman Catholic friar and later Saint Pio of Pietrelcina. The film was presented in two parts. The first part aired on 17 April 2000 while the second part aired on 19 April 2000.

Plot 
1968: in San Giovanni Rotondo, Apulia, the old Padre Pio is dying, seriously ill. During the night, there comes a mysterious Cardinal, who seems to come just to disturb Padre Pio and taunt him with all the shortcomings of the friar during his lifetime. Padre Pio then captures the moment to tell all his secrets, starting from childhood.

The young Francesco (Padre Pio), was born in a small town in Campania (Pietrelcina), and underwent talks with God, but he was also besieged and tormented by the Devil, who manifested himself in the shape of a black dog. After a few miracles, Francesco became a novice and went first to Molise, then to Pietrelcina (his hometown), and then to San Giovanni Rotondo. He also received the stigmata from God for his faithfulness, and in a convent in Apulia he decided to stay for life. Immediately his fame grows throughout Italy, but the Vatican thinks that the stigmata are false, and condemns Padre Pio. But the crowd of faithful is growing, and at the end of the story the Pope decides to change his mind.

Cast 

 Sergio Castellitto as Pio
 Loris Pazienza  as Pio as a child
 Elio Germano as 16-year-old Pio 
Jürgen Prochnow as The Apostolic Visitator
Lorenza Indovina as Cleonice
Pierfrancesco Favino as  Emanuele Brunatto
Flavio Insinna as Father Paolino
 Raffaele Castria  as Father Agostino of San Marco in Lamis
 Anita Zagaria as Pio's Mother
 Adolfo Lastretti as Father Raffaele
 Andrea Buscemi as The Superior 
 Franco Trevisi as Bishop of Manfredonia
 Renato Marchetti as Father Pellegrino
 Pietro Biondi as Senior Prelate
Gianni Bonagura as Father Benedetto
 Roberto Chevalier as Father Agostino Gemelli
 Rosa Pianeta as  Carmela Morcaldi
Tosca D'Aquino as Lea Padovani 
 Mario Erpichini as Monsignor Macchi 
Camillo Milli as Monsignor Pannullo 
Andrea Tidona as Doctor

Production
The film was filmed between November 1999 and February 2000 in San Giovanni Rotondo, Nepi and Oriolo Romano.

Reception
When the film premiered on Canale 5 on 17 April 2000, the film was watched by over 11 million people. The second episode was watched by over 12 million people, or about 45.63% of all television viewers in Italy.

See also
Padre Pio: Between Heaven and Earth (2000)
Padre Pio (film) (2022)

References

External links

2000 television films
2000 films
Italian drama films
Italian television films
2000 biographical drama films
Films set in Italy
Italian biographical drama films
Films about religion
Films directed by Carlo Carlei
2000s Italian films
Canale 5 original programming